In finance, the spot date of a transaction is the normal settlement day when the transaction is carried out as soon as practical, i.e. "on the spot". This kind of transaction is called a "spot transaction" or simply "spot", and is often described as such in contrast to a transaction which is not settled immediately, such as a futures contract or a forward contract.

Settlement date
The spot settlement date may be different for different types of financial transactions, based on market practice. For example, in the foreign exchange market, spot is normally two banking days forward for the currency pair traded.

Other settlement dates are also possible.  Standard settlement dates are calculated from the spot date.  For example, a one-month foreign exchange forward settles one month after the spot date—i.e., if today is 1 February, the spot date is 3 February and the one-month date is 3 March, assuming these dates are all business days. For a trade with two dates, such as a foreign exchange swap, the first date is usually taken as the spot date.

See also 
 Business date conventions
 Day count convention
 Foreign exchange date conventions
 Foreign exchange spot
 International Monetary Market date conventions
 Settlement date
 Spot price
 T+2
 Trade date
 Value date

References

Financial markets
Bond valuation
Swaps (finance)
Settlement (finance)